This is a list of airports in Mexico, sorted by location.

Only major national and international airports are shown.



Airports

See also 
 Transportation in Mexico
 Mexican Air Force
 Other lists:
 List of the busiest airports in Mexico
 List of airports in Baja California
 List of airports in Baja California Sur
 List of airports by ICAO code: M#MM - Mexico
 Wikipedia: WikiProject Aviation/Airline destination lists: North America#Mexico

References 
 
 
 
 Great Circle Mapper: Airports in Mexico, reference for airport codes
 Airport Guide: Mexico Airports, reference for airport codes

 
Mexico
List
Airports